David Sherlock  (1814 – 16 April 1884) was an Irish Liberal Party and Home Rule League politician. He was also a successful barrister and Law Officer.

He was the eldest son of Thomas Sherlock of Dundrum, Dublin and Isabella Ball, daughter of John Ball, a wealthy silk mercer, and his second wife Mabel Clare Bennett of Eyrecourt, County Galway, and sister of Nicholas Ball, judge of the Court of Common Pleas (Ireland).

The Sherlock family had been settled in Dundrum for some generations. They had previously held substantial lands in County Kildare, at Littlerath and Derrindaragh, from the time of Henry VII until after the Glorious Revolution. His ancestor, the wealthy merchant Christopher Sherlock, sat in the Irish House of Commons as MP for Naas in three Parliaments between 1613 and 1642. Christopher's eldest son Sir John Sherlock (1603-1652) was knighted in 1635, sat in the Irish House of Commons as MP for Dublin from 1642, and was a gentleman of the Privy Chamber.

David was first elected as one of the two Members of Parliament (MPs) for King's County in 1868 as a Liberal politician, before standing successfully as a Home Rule candidate in 1874.

He was called to the Bar in 1837, became QC in 1855 and was appointed Serjeant-at-law (Ireland). He became Third Serjeant in 1870, Second Serjeant in 1877 and First Serjeant in 1880. He was First Serjeant until his death. He also served as a part-time  judge on the North Western circuit. He was senior Crown prosecutor for Leinster at the time of his death.

He lived at Stillorgan Castle, County Dublin. He married Elizabeth Thierri, daughter of John  Thierri, chairman of the Board of Customs and Excise, and had six children,  including Thomas Thierri Sherlock (1844-1905), the  eldest son and heir, and David Sherlock (1850-1940), the noted peat industrialist.

References

External links
 

UK MPs 1868–1874
UK MPs 1874–1880
1814 births
1884 deaths
Home Rule League MPs
Serjeants-at-law (Ireland)
Members of the Parliament of the United Kingdom for King's County constituencies (1801–1922)
Irish Liberal Party MPs
Irish Queen's Counsel
19th-century King's Counsel